Case for a Rookie Hangman is a Czechoslovak drama film directed by Pavel Juráček. It was released in 1970. The movie belongs to the Czech New Wave.

The movie can be classified as a surrealist or absurdist satire, and it is based loosely on the third book of Gulliver's Travels by Jonathan Swift, but the story is transferred to an early 20th-century world in decay. The movie shows also the influence of Franz Kafka and Lewis Carroll (Alice's Adventures in Wonderland).

The satire is aimed at the Czechoslovak society, and the movie was soon banned after its release in 1970. That meant also the end of Juráček's career.

Cast
 Lubomír Kostelka – Lemuel Gulliver
 Klára Jerneková – Markéta
 Milena Zahrynowská – Dominika
 Radovan Lukavský – Professor Beiel
 Jiří Janda – Patrik
 Luděk Kopřiva – Vilém Seid
 Miloš Vávra – Emil
 Miroslav Macháček – Munodi

Release and Home Media
Asociace Ceských Filmových Klubu re-released the film to Czech theaters in 2002.

Second Run released the film to UK Blu-ray in 2019

References

External links
 

1970 films
1970 drama films
1970s Czech-language films
Czech black-and-white films
Czech satirical films
Films with screenplays by Pavel Juráček
Czech drama films
Golden Kingfisher winners
1970s Czech films